The 2019 Super Rugby season was the 24th season of Super Rugby, an annual rugby union competition organised by SANZAAR between teams from Argentina, Australia, Japan, New Zealand and South Africa. The 2019 season was the second season using the reduced 15-team format consisting of three geographical conferences since being reduced from an 18-team competition in 2017.

This was the final season that used the traditional format of international teams playing each other.

Competition format

In the group stages, there were 18 rounds of matches, with each team playing 16 matches and having two rounds of byes, resulting in a total of 120 matches. Teams played eight inter-conference matches and eight cross-conference matches; they played all the other teams in their conference twice — once at home and once away — and play once against four of the teams in the other two conferences.

The top team in each of the three conferences qualified for the quarterfinals, as do the next five teams with the best records across the three conferences, known as wildcards. The conference winners and best wildcard team hosted the quarterfinals. The quarterfinal winners progressed to the semifinal, and the winners of the semifinals progressed to the final.

Standings

Round-by-round

The table below shows each team's progression throughout the season. For each round, their cumulative points total is shown with the overall log position in brackets:

Matches

The fixtures for the 2019 Super Rugby competition were released on 12 June 2018. The following matches were played during the regular season:

Finals

The finals fixtures were as follows:

Quarterfinals

Semifinals

Final

Players

Squads

The following 2019 Super Rugby squads have been named:

Top scorers

The top ten try and point scorers during the 2019 Super Rugby season are:

Referees

The following refereeing panel was appointed by SANZAAR for the 2019 Super Rugby season:

Attendances

References

External links
 Super Rugby websites:
 Official Super Rugby website
 Australia Super Rugby website
 New Zealand Super Rugby website

 
2019
2019 in Argentine rugby union
2019 in Australian rugby union
2018–19 in Japanese rugby union
2019–20 in Japanese rugby union
2019 in New Zealand rugby union
2019 in South African rugby union
2019 rugby union tournaments for clubs